Phoebe Holcroft Watson and Peggy Michell were the defending champions, but Michell did not participate. Watson partnered with Kitty Godfree but withdrew before the first round.

Helen Moody and Elizabeth Ryan defeated Edith Cross and Sarah Palfrey in the final, 6–2, 9–7 to win the ladies' doubles tennis title at the 1929 Wimbledon Championships.

Seeds

  Helen Moody /  Elizabeth Ryan (champions)
  Kitty Godfree /  Phoebe Watson (withdrew)
  Joan Fry /  Ermyntrude Harvey (withdrew)
  Edith Cross /  Sarah Palfrey (final)

Draw

Finals

Top half

Section 1

Section 2

Bottom half

Section 3

The nationalities of Mrs BC Windle, Mrs EC Simon, Mrs LA McKenna, Miss DM Furnivall and Miss L Philip are unknown.

Section 4

References

External links

Women's Doubles
Wimbledon Championship by year – Women's doubles
Wimbledon Championships - Doubles
Wimbledon Championships - Doubles